Igor Nikitin  (born February 29, 1952) is  a Soviet weightlifter. He won the Silver medal in 100 kg category in the 1980 Summer Olympics in Moscow. .

References

1952 births
Living people
Olympic weightlifters of the Soviet Union
Olympic silver medalists for the Soviet Union
Olympic medalists in weightlifting
Weightlifters at the 1980 Summer Olympics
Medalists at the 1980 Summer Olympics
Soviet male weightlifters